Lenny Breau is an album by Canadian guitarist Lenny Breau, released in 1979.

History
Originally released on Direct-Disk Labs, it was reissued in 1995 on the Adelphi label and as Lenny Breau Trio on CD on the Genes label in 1999.

Breau's friend and mentor Chet Atkins guests on "You Needed Me".

Reception

Writing for Allmusic, music critic Scott Yanow called Breau "in fine form" and wrote of the album "This album gives listeners a strong example of his legendary artistry." In reviewing the Adelphi reissue for JazzTimes, critic Bill Milkowski wrote "Breau demonstrates mind-boggling facility and fluidity on a jazzy interpretation of Bob Dylan's 'Don't Think Twice (It's Alright)' and on a blistering, pent-up rendition of John Coltrane's 'Mister Night.' Jazz guitarists everywhere need to check out this remarkable (and remarkably overlooked) player."

Track listing
"You Needed Me" (Randy Goodrum) – 4:31
"Don't Think Twice (It's All Right)" (Bob Dylan) – 6:35
"Mister Night" (John Coltrane) – 4:45
"Neptune" (Lenny Breau) – 8:32
"Claude (Free Song)" (Breau) – 6:27

Personnel
Lenny Breau – guitar
Chet Atkins – guitar ("You Needed Me")
Don Thompson – bass
Claude Ranger – drums

References

External links
lennybreau.com discography entry

Lenny Breau albums
1979 albums